Devendra Pal Singh (born 7 August 1975) is an Indian first-class cricketer who represented Rajasthan. He made his first-class debut for Rajasthan in the 1993–94 Ranji Trophy on 12 February 1994.

References

External links
 

1975 births
Living people
Indian cricketers
Rajasthan cricketers